St. Edward the Martyr Orthodox Church is a True Orthodox Church in Brookwood, Surrey, England.

The monastic Saint Edward Brotherhood was established at Brookwood Cemetery in 1982 to prepare and care for a new Church in a fitting grade I landscape in which the relics of Saint Edward the Martyr, the King of England who was murdered in 978 and who was succeeded by force by Ethelred the Unready, were eventually enshrined in 1988. It has two communities: 
A small monastic community who chant the services of the church daily at the shrine
Orthodox Christians who form a mission parish. These Christians supplement the congregation on Sundays and feast days.

St. Edward's is currently under the jurisdiction of the Church of the Genuine Orthodox Christians of Greece (GOC-K), a Greek Old Calendarists True Orthodox Church headed by Archbishop Kallinikos of Athens. It became part of this jurisdiction in 2014 following the merger of the Orthodox Church of Greece (Holy Synod in Resistance), of which it had been a part since leaving the Russian Orthodox Church Outside Russia in 2007, with the GOC-K.

The church follows the Julian calendar and does not maintain communion with the mainstream Eastern Orthodox Church. This church is in communion with the Old Calendar Orthodox Churches of Bulgaria and Romania and that part of the Russian Orthodox Church Outside Russia which did not unite with the Russian Orthodox Church in Moscow.  In May 2007, it represented nearly one million traditionalist Orthodox Christians.

The GOC-K maintains that it is a scholarly branch of Eastern Christianity that follows original doctrines of Christianity. The Brotherhood and church body claim to look in their lives to the spiritual heritage and example of the Russian Orthodox peoples and the many saints of Britain, particularly those of the formative Kingdom of England who lived in the first ten centuries after the life of Christ.

Transport links
Rail
Road

Gallery

References

External links

Brookwood, St Edward
Greek Orthodox churches in the United Kingdom